Lorna is a 1964 independent film starring Lorna Maitland, produced and directed  by Russ Meyer. It was written in four days by James Griffith, who played the preacher in the film.

Lorna marks the end of Meyer's "nudies" and his first foray into serious film making. It was his first film in the sexploitation style with a dramatic storyline. It was one of Meyer's early, rural gothic films. It is perhaps his most romantic film, despite the tragic ending. Meyer describes the movie as "a brutal examination of the important realities of power, prophecy, freedom and justice in our society against a background of violence and lust, where simplicity is only a facade." Reviews described Maitland as "a wanton of unparalleled emotion [...] unrestrained earthiness [...] destined to set a new standard of voluptuous beauty." Lorna was called "the female Tom Jones".

Lorna  was the first of three films Meyer filmed featuring Lorna Maitland. Though still a low-budget, it was the most expensive film he had made to date, and was Meyer's first film in 35 mm.

Plot 
The publicity to Lorna exclaimed: "Without artistic surrender, without compromise, without question or apology, an important motion picture was produced: LORNA—a woman too much for one man."

Lorna (Lorna Maitland) is a sexually unsatisfied young wife married to Jim (James Rucker), who works at a salt mine and spends his evenings studying to become a Certified Public Accountant. When Lorna goes for a nude swim in the river, she is raped by an escaped convict (Mark Bradley), but her frustrated sexuality is awakened. She invites the stranger to their home while Jim is at work.

Meanwhile, Jim's co-workers tease him about his wife's beauty and infidelity. Jim returns home early and discovers Lorna's unfaithfulness. The events take place on Jim and Lorna's anniversary, which Jim has forgotten.

Cast
Lorna Maitland as Lorna
James Rucker as Jim

Production
"That was breaking into what I call the quasi-foreign film," said Meyer later. "I wanted to make a Bitter Rice in America. A morality play! Good vs evil! The incredibly stacked Lorna Maitland, the innocent husband, the devil's advocate! She paid for her sins in the end by having an ice tong struck through that heaving chest."

Meyer had originally offered the lead role to Maria Andre, an actress who had been in his earlier Heavenly Bodies! (1963). However Meyer was unhappy with her breast size and continued to look for alternatives. Meyer's wife and business partner, Eve, discovered Barbara Ann Popejoy. She was cast and Meyer paid off Andre.

Meyer renamed Popejoy to "Lorna Maitland". She was pregnant during the shoot. (She would later give the baby up for adoption.)

The film was shot in black and white over 10 days in September 1963, mainly on the small main street that runs through Locke, California.

In 1973 Meyer said at the time he made Lorna, "if I did a rape scene it struck me that it was terribly erotic and exciting. Today it would not strike me the same way. I would probably treat it in a much more ludicrous fashion, more outrageous. But then again, even then I was doing that, because I always had a woman raped in the most difficult circumstances, in a swamp, or in six feet of water, or out in a sand dune. I guess my jibes at sex have been just exactly that. I've looked upon sex in a kind of a humorous, outrageous way."

Reception
The Los Angeles Times said it was "afflicted with terrible taste and not a shred of talent anywhere."

The film was prosecuted for obscenity in Maryland, Pennsylvania and Florida, but became a major success at drive-in, downtown theaters, and even made appearances at art-house cinemas.

According to Roger Ebert, the film grossed almost a million dollars.

References

Notes

External links

 
 
 https://catalog.afi.com/Film/21384-LORNA
 https://www.tcm.com/tcmdb/title/496279/lorna
Lorna at Letterbox DVD
Complete film at Internet Archive

1964 films
American black-and-white films
1960s English-language films
Films directed by Russ Meyer
American independent films
American sexploitation films
Films with screenplays by Russ Meyer
1964 drama films
1964 independent films
1960s American films